Colpa delle favole is the third studio album by Italian singer-songwriter Ultimo, released by Honiro Label on 5 April 2019.
The album was preceded by the single "I tuoi particolari", which competed in the 69th Sanremo Music Festival, placing second in the main competition. "Fateme cantà" and "Rondini al guinzaglio" were also launched before the album was released.

It debuted at number one on the Italian FIMI Albums Chart, holding the top spot for five consecutive weeks. Colpa delle favole also became the best-selling album of 2019 in Italy.

Track listing
Track listing adapted from iTunes.

Charts

Weekly charts

Year-end charts

Certifications

References

2019 albums
Italian-language albums